Felsenberg is German for "rock hill" and may refer to:

 Felsenberg-Berntal Nature Reserve, a nature reserve in the Palatinate region of Germany
 Felsenberg a village in the borough of Schwenke (Halver), North Rhine-Westphalia, Germany
 Felsenberg (Gemeinde Pölla), a cadastral municipality in Lower Austria